Stella Stratigou (1931 – 9 October 2005) was a Greek actress. She played in theatre and films. She died on 9 October 2005. She was the sister of Stefanos, Aleka and Rena.

Filmography

References

External links

1931 births
2005 deaths
Greek actresses
Actresses from Athens